Sidney Colônia Cunha (28 June 1935 – 16 April 2011), commonly known as Chinesinho (Little Chinese), was a Brazilian footballer who played professionally, at both club and international levels, as a midfielder.

Career
Born in Rio Grande, Chinesinho played for Renner, Internacional and Palmeiras in Brazil, before moving to Italy to play for Modena Football Club, Catania, Juventus and Lanerossi Vicenza, and in the United States for the New York Cosmos.

At international level, he made 17 appearances for Brazil between 1956 and 1961, scoring seven goals; he was a member of the team that finished in second place at the 1959 South American Championship.

Honours

Club
Internacional
Campeonato Gaúcho: 1955

Palmeiras
Campeonato Paulista: 1959
Campeonato Brasileiro Série A: 1960

Catania
Coppa delle Alpi: 1964 (Runner-up)

Juventus
Serie A: 1966–67

International
Brazil
South American Championship: 1959 (Runner-up)

References

Brazilian footballers
Brazil international footballers
Sport Club Internacional players
Sociedade Esportiva Palmeiras players
Modena F.C. players
Catania S.S.D. players
Juventus F.C. players
L.R. Vicenza players
1935 births
Campeonato Brasileiro Série A players
Serie A players
Brazilian expatriate footballers
Expatriate footballers in Italy
2011 deaths
Brazilian football managers
L.R. Vicenza managers
Calcio Foggia 1920 managers
Deaths from Alzheimer's disease
Deaths from dementia in Brazil
Sociedade Esportiva Palmeiras managers
New York Cosmos players
North American Soccer League (1968–1984) players
Expatriate soccer players in the United States
Brazilian expatriate sportspeople in the United States
Association football midfielders
People from Rio Grande (Rio Grande do Sul)
Sportspeople from Rio Grande do Sul